"Company" is a song by American singer Tinashe for Nightride. The single was released by RCA Records on September 16, 2016. The song was written and produced by American R&B producer The-Dream. The song follows her previous single "Superlove", released on July 15, 2016. The song's official video was met with acclaim, with Billboard calling it "choreographic perfection".

On September 15, Tinashe performed the song, alongside "Superlove", on MTV's Wonderland program.

Critical reception
Danny Schwartz of HotNewHipHop described the song as if Tinashe were "taking applicants for a no-strings-attached situation that literally millions of young men would be more than happy to fill". However, Schwartz continued that "despite her lack of a companion", the sexual tension on the track was described as "somehow through the roof".

Music video
The song's accompanying music video directed by Jack Begert premiered on January 6, 2017, via Tinashe's Vevo account on YouTube.

Release history

References

2016 singles
2016 songs
Tinashe songs
RCA Records singles
Songs written by The-Dream
Song recordings produced by Tricky Stewart
Song recordings produced by The-Dream